Speedflow is a privately held company that provides carrier telecommunications services and IP-based software products for telecom industry.

History

2004 – Speedflow was founded in London as a VoIP-telephony services provider.

2005 – Launch of AccuCore, VoIP ERP-system.

2006 – Internal research and development team released MediaCore, session border controller for VoIP carriers.

2008 – Launch of CallMax, platform for VoIP retail providers, that included IP PBX, calling card and call shop modules.

2010 – MediaCore was the winner of the 2010 INTERNET TELEPHONY TMC Labs Innovation Award, which was implemented to reward innovative products in IT-industry.

2012 -  Speedflow started providing IT outsourcing and custom software development services.

2014 – Company launched SMS carrier services, SMS module was added to the MediaCore SBC.

2015 – Speedflow opened a new office in Plovdiv, Bulgaria and became one of the strategic investors in the region.

2016 – Introduction of CallDesk, cloud-based IP PBX platform.

2016 – Release of MediaCore Lite Softswitch, simple version of MediaCore SBC.

2017 - Official launch of innovative advertising platform AdCharge.

2019 - MediaCore SMS wins award for Best SMS Aggregation Tool. Version 4.7 released.

Projects

Speedflow supports a nonprofit anti-fraud telecommunications project - VoIPFraud List. Nowadays thousands registered users worldwide contribute in its development, filling it up with vital information, that allows improving methods of protecting from fraudulent activities on telecom market.

Natalia Ellis, Speedflow CFO, was among the top female executives of international telecommunications companies in the Hottalk Forum in Cebu, Philippines. She spoke on empowering women in male-dominated industries.

References

External links 
 Official Website
 Anti-fraud Project
MediaCore SBC page

Telecommunications companies of the United Kingdom
VoIP companies
Telecommunications companies established in 2004
Software companies of the United Kingdom
VoIP software
Telecommunications equipment vendors
Networking companies
VoIP companies of the United Kingdom